Vasilka Stancheva (born 29 November 1929) is a Bulgarian gymnast. She competed in seven events at the 1952 Summer Olympics.

References

External links
  

1929 births
Possibly living people
Bulgarian female artistic gymnasts
Olympic gymnasts of Bulgaria
Gymnasts at the 1952 Summer Olympics
Place of birth missing (living people)